Teitiota v Chief Executive Ministry of Business, Innovation and Employment concerned an application by a Kiribati man, Ioane Teitiota, for leave to appeal against a decision of New Zealand's Immigration and Protection Tribunal that declined to grant him refugee and/or protected person status. Teitiota's case became a cause célèbre for environmentalists and human rights activists as it made its way towards the Supreme Court. Teitiota was declined application for leave to appeal to the Supreme Court in July 2015. In September 2015 Teitiota was placed in police custody and deported back to Kiribati.

Teitiota's case gained international media attention as being that of the world's first climate change refugee. As Kenneth R. Weiss wrote, "Consequently, over the past year, this 38-year-old migrant farmworker has become an unlikely international celebrity, a stand-in for the thousands of people in Kiribati—as well as millions more worldwide—expected to be forced from their homes due to rising seas and other disruptions on a warming planet. Teitiota is a contender to become the world’s first climate refugee, albeit an accidental one."

Teitiota challenged his removal under the International Covenant on Civil and Political Rights. In October 2019, the UN Human Rights Committee declared his communication admissible but found no violation of Teitiota's right to life.

Background
Teitiota and his wife arrived in New Zealand from Kiribati in 2007 and continued to reside in the country illegally after the expiration of their permits. The couple have two children who were born in New Zealand but are not entitled to New Zealand citizenship. After being arrested, Teitiota applied for refugee or protected person status, which was declined by an immigration official.

Teitiota appealed the decision of the immigration official to the Immigration and Protection Tribunal,

Counsel for Teitiota sought leave to appeal the judgment of the Tribunal on questions of law unsuccessfully in the High Court before seeking the leave of the Court of Appeal.

Judgment

Counsel for Teitiota raised six questions of law in their application for leave to appeal. The Court dismissed the application for leave to appeal as they found no arguable case on any of the questions of law raised. The judgment of the Court was delivered by Justice Wild.

The first question of law dealt with by Wild J was As the word “refugee” constitutes and incorporates those who are refugees by way of climate change and its effects, did the Tribunal err in law in using the term “sociological refugee” to distinguish what could amount to valid grounds for Mr Teitiota to seek refugee status?

Wild J held that the Tribunal had correctly defined refugee in the context of the Immigration Act 2009, which imports the definition of the United Nations Convention Relating to the Status of Refugees. Refugees were those persons,

… owing to well-founded fear of being persecuted for reasons of race, religion, nationality, membership of a particular social group or political opinion, is outside the country of his nationality and is unable or, owing to such fear, is unwilling to avail himself of the protection of that country; or who, not having a nationality and being outside the country of his former habitual residence as a result of such events, is unable or, owing to such fear, is unwilling to return to it.

Furthermore, Wild J held that the Tribunal had correctly defined the meaning of, "being persecuted" [which] rested on human agency, although it could encompass non-state actors. It accepted the requirement for some form of human agency did not mean climate change could never “create pathways into the Refugee Convention or protected person jurisdiction". And Wild J held that Tribunal's reasoning that Teitiota would not be persecuted if returned to Kiribati was legally sound.

The second question dealt with by the Court concerned whether the Tribunal's ruling erred in law when it found that because everyone in Kiribati would suffer from climate change, Teitiota was disqualified from refugee status. Wild J held that the second question was a reformulation of the first, and that the part of the judgment Teitiota was appealing merely expressed the view that he was not being persecuted under one of the five protected grounds - race, religion, nationality, membership of a social group, or holding a political opinion. The third question concerned whether the Tribunal had erred by not failing to consider that climate change was caused by indirect human agency. Wild J said, "the question is not open for serious argument".  Questions four and five concerned the effect of returning to Kiribati on Teitiota's children. On these questions Wild J approved the decision in the High Court where Priestly J had ruled that on these points there was no identifiable error of law.

The sixth question concerned whether the Tribunal had made an error of law by finding that in Kiribati supplies of food and water are adequate. Wild J held this question was not open to serious argument,

Wild J concluded the judgment by stating,

References

External links
 The Making of a Climate Refugee, Ioane Teitiota profiled by Foreign Policy (January 2015).
 Teitiota v Ministry of Business Innovation and Employment [2015] NZSC 107 (20 July 2015)

Court of Appeal of New Zealand cases
2014 in New Zealand law
2014 in case law
Environmental law in New Zealand
Politics of climate change
Right of asylum in New Zealand
Kiribati–New Zealand relations
Right of asylum case law
I-Kiribati emigrants to New Zealand

fr:Réfugié écologique#Ioane Teitiota